Sultan Al Kuwari (born August 3, 1995) is a Qatari footballer who currently plays for Al-Markhiya as a striker. He also plays for Qatar's U–20 team. He graduated from the acclaimed Aspire Academy in 2013.

Club career
Besides attending Aspire Academy, Kuwari played for Al Rayyan's youth teams.  He made his first-team debut on November 2012 against Al Gharafa, but came to the forefront with the arrival of coach Manuel Jiménez, who succeeded in establishing many youth team players in the first-team. He had a trial in Spanish club Villarreal in October 2013. In April 2014, after his team was relegated to the Qatargas League, Rayyan loaned him out to Villarreal B for one season.

Club career statistics
Statistics accurate as of 24 May 2014

1Includes Emir of Qatar Cup.
2Includes Sheikh Jassem Cup.
3Includes AFC Champions League.

International career
Kuwari was part of the Qatar's under–20 football team that competed in the 2012 AFC U-19 Championship. He made 3 appearances in the tournament.

Honours
Last update: 24 May 2014.

Emir of Qatar Cup
Winner (1): 2013

Sheikh Jassem Cup
Winner (2): 2012–13, 2013–14

References 

1995 births
Living people
Qatari footballers
Qatar international footballers
Al-Rayyan SC players
Al-Sailiya SC players
Al-Shahania SC players
Al-Markhiya SC players
Qatari expatriate footballers
Expatriate footballers in Spain
Qatar Stars League players
Qatari Second Division players
People from Doha
Association football forwards
Aspire Academy (Qatar) players
Qatari expatriate sportspeople in Spain
Qatar youth international footballers
Qatar under-20 international footballers